Cordis, Latin for of the heart, may refer to:

 Cordis (band), an American chamber music group
 Cordis (medical), a medical device company
 Cordis, Auckland, a hotel in New Zealand
 Cordis Hong Kong, a hotel
 Community Research and Development Information Service (CORDIS)
 Lyria cordis, a sea snail of family Volutidae

See also
 
 Cordish (disambiguation)